Sten Einar Stensen (born 18 December 1947) is a former speed skater. Together with Amund Sjøbrend, Kay Stenshjemmet, and Jan Egil Storholt, he was one of the legendary four S-es ("four aces" in Norwegian), contemporary Norwegian top skaters in the 1970s and early 1980s. Stensen excelled at the longer distances, especially the 5,000 m and 10,000 m, and set two world records. He was World Allround Champion in 1974 and European Allround Champion in 1975. He also won Olympic gold on the 5,000 m in Innsbruck in 1976. For his accomplishments, he received the Oscar Mathisen Award in 1974 and 1976.

During the 1976 European Allround Championships in Oslo, Stensen (the defending European Champion), set a new world record on the 10,000 m, but he still lost his title to fellow Norwegian Kay Stenshjemmet by a tiny margin of only 0.005 points (equivalent to 0.10 seconds on the 10,000 m).

Stensen won gold on the 5,000 m at the 1976 Winter Olympics the next month, a race in which Piet Kleine won silver and the world record holder on that distance, Hans van Helden, won bronze. Still being the world record holder on the 10,000 m, Stensen was the favourite for that distance three days later, but he was beaten by Kleine in a close race. Again, Van Helden finished third.

After ending his speed skating career in 1978, Stensen became a Norwegian broadcasting commentator at speed skating events.

Medals
An overview of medals won by Stensen at important championships he participated in, listing the years in which he won each:

Records

World records 
Over the course of his career, Stensen skated two world records:

Personal records 

Stensen has an Adelskalender score of 165.011 points. His highest ranking on the Adelskalender was a fourth place.

References

External links
 Personal records from The Skatebase 
 

1947 births
Living people
Norwegian male speed skaters
Olympic speed skaters of Norway
Speed skaters at the 1972 Winter Olympics
Speed skaters at the 1976 Winter Olympics
Olympic gold medalists for Norway
Olympic silver medalists for Norway
Olympic bronze medalists for Norway
Olympic medalists in speed skating
World record setters in speed skating
Medalists at the 1976 Winter Olympics
Medalists at the 1972 Winter Olympics
World Allround Speed Skating Championships medalists
Sportspeople from Drammen